Ostrava Steelers are an American football team based in Ostrava, Czech Republic.  The Steelers play in the Czech League of American Football. The team formed in 1994. In 1997, the Ostrava Steelers won the Czech Bowl against the Prague Black Panthers 35-21.

American football teams in Europe
Sport in Ostrava
Sports teams in the Czech Republic
American football teams established in 1994